The Utica Bridge was a cantilever through truss bridge in Utica, Illinois. Built in 1962, it was one of the few structures that survived the 2004 tornado. The bridge was demolished by implosion on March 18, 2021.

Bridges completed in 1962
Bridges in LaSalle County, Illinois
Bridges over the Illinois River
Truss bridges in the United States
Steel bridges in the United States
Road bridges in Illinois